Utekáč is a village and municipality in the Poltár District in the Banská Bystrica Region of Slovakia.

In the middle of Veporské vrchy, in the narrow valley of the Rimavica river, the village Utekáč is situated. Its name is derived from the útek (meaning escape) of Hungarian king Bela IV ahead of the Tatars. The first mention about Utekáč is from the year 1593.

Development of Utekáč began in 1787 when earl Forgáč came to the territory. He built up a few glassworks from which just the biggest – Clara – is preserved. Aboriginal inhabitants of the glasswork's colony moved in families of glassworks experts from Germany, Hungary, Bohemia and Moravia. Modern history began on 1 January 1993 with establishment of the separate village. Utekáč was only an industrial part of the village Kokava nad Rimavicou before. With its industrial and housing development it is a small town now. Its villages Salajka, Drahová, Havrilovo, Dlhá Lúka, Ďurkovka, Bánik, Nad Rimava and Cisársko are typical mountain settlements of original folk architecture character. The residences in the village Salajka are Finnish wooden storeyed houses.

From the historic point of view, there is the dominant mansion of Earl Forgáč and a Chapel of Saint Anton Paduánsky that also serves as the tomb of the Kuchynka family – the owners of glassworks. In Drahová and Havrilovo there are interesting small chapels. A trio of fujara makers and fujarists, the Kubincs brought the village fame. During the II. World War and SNP there were severe fighting on the village's territory. The memorial of fallen in local park and the vale of Nikolaj Chmelnický with three memorials characterize events from that period. Lovers of hiking, mushroom picking, hunting and fishing will enjoyed the vicinity. The village has a suitable location for development of tourism, forest tourism and farming. There are excellent conditions for running tracks and downhill skiing – ski tows are directly in Utekáč and in the vicinity.

Attractions: Folk crafts, Glass tradition, Tourist march "Utekáčska horská tridsiatka", "Utekáčska horská stovka", Ski tow.

References

External links
 
 

Villages and municipalities in Poltár District